Peter A. Clayton is a British archaeologist and numismatist, and the former managing editor of British Museum Publications.

Clayton has written extensively on the ancient world and ancient Egypt in particular and has produced a number of books for children.

Clayton is a member of the British government's Treasure Valuation Committee.

Selected publications
Chronicle of the Pharaohs. Thames & Hudson, London.
Archaeological sites in Britain. Weidenfeld & Nicolson, London, 1976. 
The rediscovery of Ancient Egypt: Artists and travellers in the Nineteenth Century. Thames & Hudson, London, 1982. 
The seven wonders of the ancient world. 1990.
The Valley of the Kings. Wayland, 1995.

References 

Living people
Year of birth missing (living people)
British numismatists
British editors
British archaeologists